Cupularia may refer to:
 Cupularia, a disused synonym for Craterium, a genus of slime molds
 Cupularia, a disused synonym for Inula, a genus of plants